Callaway is a surname. Notable people with the surname include:

Ann Hampton Callaway, American singer, songwriter, and actress
Antonio Callaway, American football player
Catherine Callaway, news anchor
Charles Callaway (1838–1915), geologist
David Callaway, nanophysicist
Dean Callaway, Australian rugby league footballer
Ely Callaway Jr. (1919–2001), American businessman best known as founder of Callaway Golf
Enoch Callaway (1924–2014), American psychiatrist 
Francis Oscar Callaway (1872-1947), former US Representative (D-TX)
Frank Callaway, Australian music educator
Fuller Earle Callaway (1870-1928), businessman and former president of the American Cotton Manufacturers Association
Henry Callaway, bishop of the Anglican Church
Howard "Bo" Callaway, former U.S. Representative (R-GA) and Secretary of the Army
Liz Callaway, American actress and singer
James Callaway, grandson of Daniel Boone
James E. Callaway, American politician
Marquez Callaway (born 1998), American football player
Mickey Callaway, professional baseball player
Mark William Callaway, WWE star The undertaker
Nicholas Callaway, founder and CEO of Callaway Arts & Entertainment
Norman Callaway, Australian cricketer
Phil Callaway, Christian humorist
Reeves Callaway, founder of Callaway Cars Incorporated
Ragan Callaway, plant and community ecologist
Richard Callaway, early settler of Kentucky
Richard Callaway, cricket umpire
Samuel R. Callaway, American railroad executive
Sydney Callaway, Australian cricketer
Thomas Callaway (born 1974), also known as CeeLo Green, American singer